The state of Ketu is located in present-day Republic of Benin.

In the Yoruba language, the word oba means king or ruler. It is also common for the rulers of the various Yoruba domains to have their own special titles. In Ketu the Oba is referred to as the Aleketu of Ketu

References
 http://www.rulers.org/benitrad.html
 http://www.citrus-moon.com

See also 
Benin
Yoruba states
List of rulers of the Yoruba state of Dassa
List of rulers of the Yoruba state of Icha
List of rulers of the Yoruba state of Oyo
List of rulers of the Yoruba state of Sabe
Lists of office-holders

Yoruba history
Benin history-related lists
Government of Benin
Lists of African rulers